The Trostletown Bridge is a historic covered bridge in Quemahoning Township, Somerset County, Pennsylvania.  It was built in 1845, and is a  Kingpost truss bridge, with half-height plank siding and an asbestos shingled gable roof. The bridge crosses Stony Creek.  It is one of 10 covered bridges in Somerset County.

It was added to the National Register of Historic Places in 1980.

References

Covered bridges in Somerset County, Pennsylvania
Covered bridges on the National Register of Historic Places in Pennsylvania
Bridges completed in 1845
Bridges in Somerset County, Pennsylvania
National Register of Historic Places in Somerset County, Pennsylvania
Road bridges on the National Register of Historic Places in Pennsylvania
Wooden bridges in Pennsylvania
King post truss bridges in the United States